Nadezhda Andreyevna Durova (September 17, 1783 – March 21, 1866), also known as Alexander Durov, Alexander Sokolov and Alexander Andreevich Alexandrov, was a woman who, while disguised as a man, became a decorated soldier in the Russian cavalry during the Napoleonic Wars. She was one of the first known female officers in the Russian military. Her memoir, The Cavalry Maiden, is a significant document of its era because few junior officers of the Napoleonic Wars published their experiences, and because it is one of the earliest autobiographies in the Russian language.

Early biography 
Nadezhda Durova was born in an army camp at Voznesenskoe, Ukraine, as the daughter of a Russian major. Her father placed her in the care of his soldiers after an incident that nearly killed her in infancy when her abusive mother threw her out the window of a moving carriage. As a small child, Durova learned all the standard marching commands and her favorite toy was an unloaded gun.

After her father retired from service, she continued playing with broken sabers and frightened her family by secretly taming a stallion that they considered unbreakable. In 1801 she married a Sarapul judge, V. S. Chernov, and gave birth to a son in 1803. Some accounts claim that she ran away from her home with a Cossack officer in 1805. In 1807, at the age of twenty-four, she disguised herself as a boy, deserted her son and husband, and enlisted in the Polish Horse Regiment (later classified as uhlans) under the alias Alexander Sokolov.

Fiercely patriotic, Durova regarded army life as freedom. She enjoyed animals and the outdoors, but felt she had little talent for traditional women's work. In her memoirs she describes an unhappy relationship with her mother, warmth toward her father, and nothing at all about her own married life.

Military service and later life
She fought in the major Russian engagements of the 1806-1807 Prussian campaign. During two of those battles, she saved the lives of two fellow Russian soldiers. The first was an enlisted man who fell off his horse on the battlefield and suffered a concussion. She gave him first aid under heavy fire and brought him to safety as the army retreated around them. The second was an officer, unhorsed but uninjured. Three French dragoons were closing on him. She couched her lance and scattered the enemy. Then, against regulations, she let the officer borrow her own horse to hasten his retreat, which left her more vulnerable to attack.

During the campaign, she wrote a letter to her family explaining her disappearance. They used their connections in a desperate attempt to locate her. The rumor of an amazon in the army reached Tsar Alexander I, who took a personal interest. Durova's chain of command reported that her courage was peerless. Summoned to the palace at St. Petersburg, she impressed the Tsar so much that he awarded Durova the Cross of St. George and promoted her to lieutenant in a hussar unit (Mariupol Hussar Regiment). The story that there was the heroine in the army with the name Alexander Sokolov had become well-known by that time. So the Tsar awarded her a new pseudonym, Alexandrov, based on his own name.

Durova's youthful appearance hurt her chances for promotion. In an era when Russian officers were expected to grow a mustache she looked like a boy of sixteen. She transferred away from the hussars to the Lithuanian Uhlan Regiment in order to avoid the colonel's daughter who had fallen in love with her. Durova saw action again during Napoleon's invasion of Russia in 1812. She fought in the Battle of Smolensk. During the Battle of Borodino a cannonball wounded her in the leg, yet she continued serving full duty for several days afterward until her command ordered her away to recuperate. She retired from the army in 1816 with the rank of stabs-rotmistr, the equivalent of captain-lieutenant.

A chance meeting introduced her to Aleksandr Pushkin some twenty years later. When he learned that she had kept a journal during her army service he encouraged her to publish it as a memoir. She added background about her early childhood but changed her age by seven years and eliminated all reference to her marriage. Durova published this as The Cavalry Maiden in 1836. Durova also wrote five other novels. Durova continued to wear male clothing for the rest of her life, continued to use her male alias, and spoke using masculine grammar. She died in Yelabuga and was buried with full military honors. Her son, Ivan Durov, had died 10 years prior.

Durova's gender identity
There has been a debate over whether Durova could be labelled as a transgender man. Much of the scholarship concerning Durova treats her as a cross-dressing woman, however, Durova in her personal life rejected femininity (even expressing an aversion to the female sex) and behaved as a man. In The Cavalry Maiden, Durova describes herself with terms of androgyny, describing herself both as a bogatyr and as an Amazon warrior. Durova was also a writer of prose, and one of her stories, Nurmeka, revolves  around a male who cross-dresses as a female, leading to speculation that this was an expression of Durova's transgender identity. Terms relating to non-standard gender identity such as transvestite (1910), transsexual (1949), and transgender (1971) were coined long after Durova's death, so she could not have used the modern label of transgender; despite this, modern scholarship has increasingly adopted the view that Durova was an example of a transgender individual.

Legacy

Besides being a rare example of a female soldier's military memoir, The Cavalry Maiden is one of the few sustained accounts of the Napoleonic wars to describe events from the perspective of a junior officer and one of the earliest autobiographical works in Russian literature.

Durova became a figure of some cultural interest in Eastern Europe but remained largely unknown to the English-speaking world until Mary Fleming Zirin's translation of The Cavalry Maiden in 1988. Durova is now a subject of university syllabi and scholarly publications in comparative literature and Russian history.

Artistic works about Nadezhda Durova
Nadezhda Durova, an opera by Anatoly Bogatyrev.
A Long Time Ago, a play by Alexander Gladkov.
Hussar Ballad, an operetta by Tikhon Khrennikov
Hussar Ballad, a film directed by Eldar Ryazanov.
The Girl Who Fought Napoleon: A Novel of the Russian Empire, a novel by Linda Lafferty

Bibliography
Durova, Nadezhda, The Cavalry Maiden: Journals of a Russian Officer in the Napoleonic Wars. Mary Fleming Zirin. Indiana University Press, 1989.  (see book reviews on Amazon.com).

See also
Battle of Eylau
Battle of Friedland
Battle of Jena-Auerstedt
History of Russia (1796–1855)
List of wartime cross-dressers
Women in the military

Notes

References

Barta, Peter I., "Gender Trial and Gothic Trill: Nadezhda Durova's Subversive Self-Exploration" by Amdreas Schonle in Gender and Sexuality in Russian Civilization, 2001.

External links

 A History Net summary of Durova's life.
 A Russian culture navigator account of Durova.
 A brief excerpt from Durova's experiences during the retreat to Moscow in 1812.
 The Durov Animal Theater in Moscow, a surviving legacy of the Durov clan.
 Durova's memoir 
 Nadezhda Durova in the Brockhaus and Efron Encyclopedic Dictionary - 
  Biography of Durova

1783 births
1866 deaths
Female wartime cross-dressers
Military personnel from Kyiv
Memoirists from the Russian Empire
Russian military personnel of the Napoleonic Wars
Russian people of the Napoleonic Wars
Russian nobility
Women in the Imperial Russian military
18th-century military personnel
19th-century military personnel